Kopališta is a village in the municipality of Vareš, Bosnia and Herzegovina.

Demographics 
According to the 2013 census, its population was 10, all Croats.

References

Populated places in Vareš